Perebiynis is a Ukrainian-language surname. The word perebiy + nis literally means the contracted phrase "break the nose". It may also be transliterated via Russian language as Perebiynos or Perebeynos.

The surname may refer to:

, Ukrainian diplomat 
Tatiana Perebiynis, Ukrainian tennis player
, Ukrainian poet, recipient of state awards 
Maxim Perebeynos, a soloist of the Russian Helikon Opera company

Ukrainian-language surnames